Manuel Velasco may refer to: 

Manuel Velasco Coello (b. 1980), Mexican politician, current Governor of Chiapas
Manuel Velasco Suárez (1914–2001), Mexican neurologist and Governor of Chiapas from 1970 to 1976
Manuel de Velasco y Tejada, Spanish admiral during the Battle of Vigo Bay (1702)
Victor Manuel Velasco Herrera, Mexican theoretical physicist